"I Like That" is a song by American singer Janelle Monáe from her third studio album Dirty Computer. It was first released as a promotional single on April 23, 2018, before being released as the fourth single from the album on August 17, 2018. Three remix singles were released for the song on August 17, August 24, and November 9, 2018. The song peaked at number 14 on the Hot R&B Songs chart, 19 on the Adult R&B Songs chart, and was certified Gold in the United States in May 2020.

Track listing

Accolades

Charts

Certifications

References

2018 singles
2018 songs
Janelle Monáe songs
Songs written by Janelle Monáe